Local government in the Bahamas exists in two forms, namely second-schedule and third-schedule district councils. There are a total of 32 local government districts: 13 second-schedule districts, which are further sub-divided into town areas, and 19 third-schedule districts, which are all unitary authorities. The second and third schedules together make up the first schedule. Local government policy is formulated and administered by the Department of Lands and Local Government through the Office of the Prime Minister. The day-to-day policy handling of the portfolio falls to the Minister of Local Government who also is empowered to create new local government areas from time to time based on demographics. The administrative and financial management is overseen by the ministry's permanent secretary.

History

Local government previously existed in the Bahamas in the form of appointed "Board of Works". Here towns and villages held their influence over these Board of Works, but almost all final decisions were made by the central government through that islands' Commissioner. The modern system of local government that is in use today was implemented on 8 March 1996. The Out Islands of the country could now enjoy a somewhat greater degree of autonomy, but New Providence Island, in which the capital city Nassau is located, was to be directly governed by the central government. The act that implemented local government had described all districts as either being Second-Schedule or Third-Schedule districts.

Districts of The Bahamas
The Districts of the Bahamas provide a system of Local Government everywhere in The Bahamas except New Providence (where Nassau the capital is located, whose affairs are handled directly by the central government). The current system dates from 1996 when 23 districts were created by The Bahamas Local Government Act of 1996; a further 9 have been added since 1999.

Local Government in The Bahamas has seen great success since its introduction, but there has been concern over the case of New Providence and whether or not it should have local government.

New Providence

Types of Councils

Every district in the Bahamas, with the exception of New Providence, has a district council. A district council is a corporate body with perpetual succession; capable of entering into contracts, of suing and being sued, of acquiring, holdings, leasing and disposing of property of any description, and of doing all such things and entering into such transactions that are within the scope of the Local Government Act. District Councillors are elected by the population of that district in accordance with Local Government Act. As stated in The Bahamas Local Government Act 1996, Districts councillors shall within two weeks of their election, elect from among themselves a Chief Councillor. The Chief Councillor is the representative of a Districts Council for all affairs and presides over all meetings and also themselves co-ordinate these meetings.

All districts councils are classed as first-schedule councils. The first-schedule is further sub-divided into two types of councils: two tier second-schedule district councils that have town committees within their jurisdiction, and unitary third-tier district councils. Second-schedule districts have the following statutory boards and committees:

 Road Traffic Licensing Authority
 Port and Harbour Authority
 Hotel Licensing Board
 Liquor and Shop Licensing
 Town Planning Committee

Town committees are sub-structures of the second-schedule district councils, but are also corporate bodies themselves. They share responsibility with second-schedule district councils for a number of the schedule local government functions. They also have statutory responsibility for local regulation and licensing within their jurisdiction. Third-schedule districts councils are unique within the Bahamas because they combine the responsibilities of the second-schedule districts and of the town committees. Both second- and third-schedule district councils carry out a building control function...

Elections

Local government elections take place once every three years in the Bahamas with the most recent elections taking place on 27 January  2022. The 2020 elections were postponed due to COVID-19 until Emergency Power Orders were lifted. The voting system used in local government elections is the first-past-the-post system. Both councillors of third-schedule district councils and members of town committees are directly elected, while members of second-schedule councils are indirectly elected from town committees. Third schedule district councils have between five and nine members, whereas the size of councils in both second-schedule councils and town committees varies according to population size. By elections are held whenever the need arises. A councillor is deemed to have resigned if they are absent for three consecutive meetings.

For both types of district councils the Chief Councillors and their deputies are indirectly elected from amongst the elected officials. They serve for the lifetime of the council and the Minister of Local Government determines their stipend. Second-schedule district councils' statutory boards also elect chairpersons and their deputies from amongst their members.

Major Islands

See also
Chief Councillor
Hope Town District Council
Constituencies of the Bahamas
ISO 3166-2:BS
List of Caribbean First-level Subdivisions by Total Area
List of newspapers in the Bahamas
Commonwealth Local Government Forum-Americas

References

External links
Bahamas.gov.bs

 
Subdivisions of the Bahamas
Bahamas, Districts
Bahamas 1
Government
Bahamas geography-related lists